Bon Shovar (also Romanized as Bon Shovār, Ban Shovar, Bon Shevār, and Bon Shūr; also known as Band-e Shovār) is a village in Seydun-e Jonubi Rural District, Seydun District, Bagh-e Malek County, Khuzestan Province, Iran. At the 2006 census, its population was 1,019, in 170 families.

References 

Populated places in Bagh-e Malek County